Colegio San Agustin – Biñan (also referred to as CSA-Biñan), is a private, Catholic coeducational basic and higher education institution run by the Augustinian Province of Santo Niño de Cebu, Philippines of the Order of Saint Augustine in Biñan, Laguna, Philippines. It was founded by the Augustinians 1985.

Its primary and secondary education programs are accredited Level III by the Philippine Accrediting Association of Schools, Colleges and Universities (PAASCU).

History
Colegio San Agustin – Biñan began as a school for boys and girls attending preschool through third grade. Incorporated on November 16, 1984, it is located on a five-hectare site donated by a private land developer to the Augustinian Province of Sto. Niño de Cebu, Philippines. The first faculty and staff consisted of twenty lay personnel and three priest-administrators catering to the needs of 646 students. The founding administrators included Rev. Rodolfo P. Sicio, OSA as Rector and Principal, Rev. Alfredo Jubac, OSA as treasurer, and Rev. Marcelino Malana, OSA as a guidance counselor and sports coordinator. Miss Doris S. Calog serves as the school Registrar, Assistant Principal, and Academic Coordinator of all departments. One of the pioneer personnel still connected/works at present, she's Ms. Nelia O. Villodres of the Grade School Dept. ( former Preschool Teacher 1985)

The Preschool Department was part of the Colegio San Agustin since it started the operation in June 1985. There were 290 pupils in its first year of operation. The department continued to expand its structure as more pupils were added each year. Improving the curriculum was done in response to the needs of the pupils. Total enrollment peaked at 790 in the academic year 1992–1993. Appropriate measures were introduced to effectively manage the growing pupils' populace and sustain the upgraded standard of instruction. Strict screening procedures were also implemented both for the admission of pupils and for the hiring of faculty.

Patron saint

The school is named in honor of St. Augustine of Hippo, a key figure in the doctrinal development of Western Christianity and a "Doctor of the Church" Two of his surviving works, namely, "The Confessions" (his autobiography) and "The City of God," are regarded as Western classics. Augustine is often considered to be one of the theological fountainheads of the Reformation because of his teaching on salvation and grace. Martin Luther, perhaps the greatest figure of the Reformation, was himself an Augustinian friar.

Other English speaking Augustinian Schools with the same patron include Colegio San Agustin-Makati, Colegio del Santo Niño (Cebu), Colegio San Agustin-Bacolod, St. Augustine's College, Brookvale in Sydney, Australia, St. Augustine College Preparatory School, Richland, New Jersey; St. Augustine High School, San Diego, California; and Austin Preparatory School in Reading, Massachusetts - all three in the United States; and St. Augustine College in Malta.

School seal

Symbols and meanings
 Golden Eagle – represents the lofty intellect of St. Augustine as a soaring eagle of Hippo, Africa.
 Heart – symbolizes love and charity, the first rule of St. Augustine.
 Crosier and mitre – represent the bishopric of St. Augustine.
 Book – symbolizes the writings of St. Augustine and his intellectual depth as a writer, making him the greatest Doctor of the Church.
 Tolle Lege, Tolle Lege – (Latin, "Take up and read"), the words spoken by a voice heard by St. Augustine which led to his conversion to Catholicism in the year 386.
 Colors – Red stands for courage, and gold for victory over evil.
 Virtus et Scientia – (Latin, "Virtue and Science"), the traditional motto of the Augustinians, representing the two pillars of the Augustinian way of education.

Instructional programs
The instructional program in the Grade School (GS), Junior High School (JHS), and Senior High School (SHS) Department highlights the formation of mind and character of the students and has all been aligned to the School's Vision-Mission.

The three departments follows the K to 12 Basic Education Curriculum (BEC) effective academic year 2012–2013. This shall be implemented starting with the roll-out of Grades 1 and 7 in pursuance to Department of Education Order No. 31, series of 2012.  The subjects and course programs of each grade level have been articulated in all departments to make certain that there is no overlapping in content areas and to monitor the continuity of learning.

Preschool Department (nursery, pre-kinder, kinder level)

Grade School Department (Grades 1 to 6) 
The curricular offerings are modified with the Computer and Christian Living.

Junior High School Department (Grades 7 to 10) 
The curriculum is modified with Christian Values Education, Statistics, Geometry Advanced Algebra with Trigonometry, Research, and Information and Communications Technology (ICT) subjects. Robotics is included in the curriculum wherein it enhances the ICT, Mathematics and Science subjects.

Senior High School (Grades 11 to 12)

Academic track 
Science, Technology, Engineering and Mathematics (STEM)
Accountancy and Business Management (ABM)
Humanities and Social Sciences (HUMSS)

Tech-Voc-Liv track 
Information and Communications Technology (ICT)
Home Economics (HE)

Sports track

International Students Center 
The increasing number of international students and their schedule of irregular enrolment prompted the former school president, Rev. Fr. Richard L. Pido, OSA to creare the International Students Office (ISO) which is now known as the International Students Center (ISC). The Bureau of Immigration granted its license last April 28, 2005 with License No. AFF-05-054. Its operation formally started last June 2008.

The center caters students from different countries like Canada, China, Finland, Germany, India, Italy, Japan, Papua Guinea, Singapore, South Korea, Taiwan, Thailand, United Kingdom, United States of America, and United Arab Emirates.

Program offerings 
 Regular Class Program
 Intervention Program
 English Language Program 
 Special Communication Arts Program I, II, III 
 Special Filipino Language Program
 Social Studies for the International Students
 Sit-in Program for the International Students

College Department 
The College Department opened in the Academic Year 1998-1999 and offered 12 courses in its initial year of operation, ten were baccalaureate programs and two were associate courses. However, in AY 2001–2002, the college streamlined and focused in offering six major courses. The first set that were granted government recognition by the Commission on Higher Education (CHED) on October 19, 2001, were Bachelor of Science in Foreign Service, Bachelor of Science in Computer Science, Bachelor of Science in Psychology, Bachelor of Science in Tourism, and Bachelor of Science in Hotel and Restaurant Management. On June 26, 2001, Bachelor of Arts in Communication was offered. Bachelor of Science in Information Technology and Bachelor of Science in Business Administration followed in the AY 2003–2004.

College course offerings
 Bachelor of Arts in Communication
 Bachelor of Science in Business Administration
 Major in Marketing Management
 Bachelor of Science in Computer Science
 Bachelor of Science in Foreign Service
 Bachelor of Science in Hotel and Restaurant Management
 Bachelor of Science in Information Technology
 Bachelor of Science in Psychology
 Bachelor of Science in Tourism

Notable alumni 
 Ken Chan
 Taki Saito
 Angeli Gonzales

See also
 Augustinian Province of the Most Holy Name of Jesus of the Philippines
 Colegio San Agustin - Makati
 Colegio San Agustin - Bacolod
 University of San Agustin
 Santo Niño de Cebu

References

Gallery

Colegio San Agustin-Binan
Schools in Biñan
Educational institutions established in 1985
Catholic elementary schools in the Philippines
1985 establishments in the Philippines